William Allen is a sculpture depicting the American politician of the same name by Charles Henry Niehaus. The statue was gifted by the U.S. state of Ohio to the National Statuary Hall Collection in 1887, but later replaced with one of Thomas Edison due to Allen's pro-slavery viewpoints. Allen's statue was relocated to the Ross County Heritage Center, in Chillicothe, Ohio.

See also
 1887 in art

References

External links
 

1887 sculptures
Chillicothe, Ohio
Allen, William
Monuments and memorials in Ohio
Relocated buildings and structures in Ohio
Sculptures of men in Ohio
Statues in Ohio